Ada Colau Ballano (born 3 March 1974) is a Spanish activist and politician who is the current Mayor of Barcelona. On 13 June 2015 she was elected Mayor of Barcelona, the first woman to hold the office,  as part of the citizen municipalist platform, Barcelona En Comú. Colau was one of the founding members and spokespeople of the Plataforma de Afectados por la Hipoteca (PAH) (Platform for People Affected by Mortgages), which was set up in Barcelona in 2009 in response to the rise in evictions caused by unpaid mortgage loans and the collapse of the Spanish property market in the wake of the 2008 financial crisis.

Early and personal life
Ada Colau was born in Barcelona, and grew up in the Guinardó neighbourhood. She went to school at the Santa Anna and Febrer Academies, and went on to study philosophy at the University of Barcelona but lacks the pertinent degree due to leaving her studies before completion, precisely by one subject, which she claims was due to economic instability in her family.

Colau has openly referred to herself as bisexual. She and her partner Adrià Alemany Salafranca have two children.

Platform for People Affected by Mortgages

Ada Colau was one of the founding members of the Platform for People Affected by Mortgages (PAH) in 2009, and acted as the organization's spokeswoman until 2014. Colau rose to national prominence after calling a representative of the Spanish Banking Association "a criminal" while representing the PAH at a parliamentary hearing on the housing crisis in February 2013. Colau supports the use of escraches, public protests outside the homes of government officials. 

In March, Madrid Government delegate Cristina Cifuentes of the People's Party accused Colau of supporting the Basque radical nationalist party Bildu. Colau is coauthor of the book Mortgaged Lives, based on her experiences of grassroots campaigning and direct action with the PAH.

Barcelona en Comú
On 7 May 2014, Ada Colau announced her resignation as spokesperson of the PAH. In June 2014 she founded Barcelona en Comú (formerly known as Guanyem Barcelona), a citizen platform that stood in the May 2015 Barcelona municipal elections. Barcelona en Comú won a plurality in the elections (11 of 41 city council seats) and on 13 June 2015 she was sworn in as mayor with the favourable vote of an absolute majority of councillors. She headed again the Barcelona en Comú list vis-à-vis the 26 May 2019 Barcelona municipal election. The list came up second, close to the ERC list headed by Ernest Maragall, with the same number of municipal councillors (10) as the latter. On 15 June 2019, during the inaugural session of the new municipal council, Colau commanded a qualified majority of the plenary for the investiture vote (21 out of 41 municipal councillors; presumably with the endorsement of the 10 municipal councillors of Barcelona en Comú, along the 8 municipal councillors of the PSC and 3 out 6 individual councillors of the Barcelona pel Canvi–Ciutadans list: Manuel Valls, Celestino Corbacho and Eva Parera), thus renewing her mandate as Mayor of Barcelona.

Catalan independence and pro-Europeanism

Colau stated in 2016, "I’ve never been nationalist or pro-independence." Colau was originally against the referendum vote; however, a week before the actual vote, she stated a referendum could take place after sustained pressure from pro-independence forces. After the referendum of the 1-O, she embraced a central position rejecting both an UDI and the intervention in the Catalan self-government. She considers herself in the camp "committed to advancing towards a democratic, social and freedom-loving European project".

Controversies and criticism

Alleged corruption scandals 
Ada Colau was indicted by the Spanish judiciary in 2022 for alleged irregularities in the handing of subsidies to entities linked to her party Barcelona en Comú, including to the Platform for People Affected by Mortgages which she founded in 2009. Colau faced criticism from public opinion sectors because she refused to resign from her post as mayor, despite the ethical code of conduct of the party stating that party members pledge to resign from their posts should they be indicted for corruption, embezzlement or influence peddling, among other crimes. A judge later dismissed a case involving some of the charges pressed against her.

In November 2022, the Provincial Court of Barcelona reopened the case against her. The writ stated that there are indications of malfeasance in the repeated handing out of subsidies to organisations linked to Colau.

Accusations of nepotism 
In 2022, the Ethics and Conduct Committee of the Council of Barcelona raised concerns about nepotism in the municipal institutions. The Committee produced a report in which it heavily criticised the decision to hire Alicia Ramos, partner of the Housing councillor, as an advisor to the staff of Ada Colau on grounds of a potential conflict of interest. The report also stated that Alicia Ramos was not hired following a competitive process, and that the authorities failed to provide any reasons as to why Ramos was suitable for the role.

Colau has also been criticised for several other controversial hirings, such as that of her husband Adrià Alemany.

Crime rates in Barcelona 
The police union of the Catalan autonomous police has accused Colau of "normalising" and "dehumanising" the rising number of crimes committed in Barcelona during her mayoralty after a 25-year-old man was fatally stabbed during La Mercè festivities in September 2022. Albert Batlle, the deputy mayor of Security of the Council of Barcelona, admitted in 2019 that the city was experiencing a "security crisis". In that same year, rising insecurity levels prompted the United States embassy in Spain to issue a statement warning about violent crime in Barcelona.

Allegations of hypocrisy on environmental issues 
During her period as mayor of Barcelona, Colau has maintained a political stance against activities that are susceptible of contributing to greenhouse gas emissions and air pollution. She has repeatedly opposed the expansion of El Prat airport and the use of private cars in the city, and has pushed regional authorities to restrict the number of cruise ships arrivals in Barcelona. In 2020 she declared a "climate emergency", advocating limiting the consumption of meat at schools and forbidding councillors from using the Barcelona-Madrid air shuttle. Colau also called for a reduction of air traffic during the C40 Cities 2019 summit, arguing that aeroplanes generate greenhouse gas emissions that are "very dangerous for the planet".

Ada Colau, along with two other council officers, faced accusations of hypocrisy after taking a transatlantic flight to Chile to attend the investiture of Chilean president Gabriel Boric in 2022, followed by a flight to Argentina. A local news outlet estimated the total carbon footprint of their trip at 3339 kg. She also came under criticism in 2020 for using a car to attend a radio interview in which she advocated using public transport instead of cars.

Awards
2013 - Award for Human Rights, Barcelona Human Rights Film Festival
2013 - Award for Defenders of Social Rights, Colau Ada and Rafael Mayoral, representing the Plataforma de Afectados por la Hipoteca (PAH) (Platform for People Affected by Mortgages), for their continuing struggle for the legal right to a decent home, for their capacity to mobilize and citizen participation, and for their example of solidarity. Award from the media "Human Journalism".
2013 - European Citizens' Prize (with the PAH)
2013 - United Women Prize from the Artistas Intérpretes, Sociedad de Gestión (AISGE).

Publications

Books
2012 - Ada Colau and Adria Alemany, Mortgaged Lives. Foreword by Gerardo Pisarello and José Coy, English Translation by Michelle Teran 
2013 - Ada Colau and Adria Alemany, Yes you can! Chronicle of a small great victory. Editorial Destino, Collection Imago Mundi, 19 April 2013, 96 pp.

Articles
2011 - Ada Colau, How to stop an eviction, Platform for People Affected by Mortgages (PAH), July 2011.
2014 - Ada Colau, Making the democratic revolution happen, Diario Público, 5 December 2014.

References

External links

Ada Colau - official website

Spanish activists
Spanish women activists
Mayors of Barcelona City Council
Women mayors of places in Spain
Housing in Spain
21st-century Spanish writers
Anti-globalization activists
1974 births
Living people
Housing rights activists
Bisexual politicians
Women politicians from Catalonia
Politicians from Catalonia
People from Barcelona
Barcelona municipal councillors (2015–2019)
Barcelona municipal councillors (2019–2023)
LGBT mayors of places in Spain